Gallantivirus is a genus of viruses, in the family Tombusviridae. Plants serve as natural hosts. There is only one species in this genus: Galinsoga mosaic virus. Diseases associated with this genus include: chlorotic or necrotic local lesions, systemic mosaic; leaf malformation.

Structure
Viruses in Gallantivirus are non-enveloped, with icosahedral and spherical geometries, and T=3 symmetry. The diameter is around 34 nm. Genomes are linear, around 4kb in length.

Life cycle
Viral replication is cytoplasmic. Entry into the host cell is achieved by penetration into the host cell. Replication follows the positive stranded RNA virus replication model. Positive stranded RNA virus transcription, using the premature termination model of subgenomic RNA transcription is the method of transcription. The virus exits the host cell by tubule-guided viral movement. Plants serve as the natural host. Transmission routes are mechanical, seed borne, and contact.

References

External links

 Viralzone: Gallantivirus
 ICTV

Tombusviridae
Virus genera